Lubor Bárta (8 August 1928 in Lubná near Litomyšl – 5 November 1972 in Prague) was a Czech composer.

Bárta studied musicology and aesthetics from 1946 to 1948 at Charles University in Prague and was a pupil of Jaroslav Řídký at the Academy of Performing Arts until 1952. While he was still a student he composed his first chamber works: Piano Variations, Three Polka Studies, Violin Sonata, Divertimento for Wind Quintet and String Quartet. His early compositions were influenced by Stravinsky and Bartók, but he gradually came into his own compositional style, especially apparent in his instrumental works. From 1952 to 1955 he was an artistic leader of the ensemble Proud. He subsequently lived as a teacher and freelance composer in Prague. Bartá died at the young age of forty-four.

He composed three symphonies, concerti, string quartets, piano pieces, sonatas and other chamber music.

Selected works 
 Orchestral
 Symphony No.1 (1955)
 Concerto for chamber orchestra (1956)
  (Dramatic Suite) (1958)
  (From Eastern Bohemia), Symphonic suite (1960)
 , Suite for chamber orchestra (1964)
  
  
  
  
 Symphony No.2 (1969)
  for string orchestra (1971)
 Symphony No.3 (1972)

Concertante
 Concerto No.1 for violin and orchestra (1952)
 Four Instrumental Solos for piano, violin, cello and flute with orchestral accompaniment (1955)
 Concerto for viola and orchestra (1957)
 Concerto for piano and orchestra (1959)
 Concerto No.2 for violin and orchestra (1969)

Chamber music
 Divertimento for Wind Quintet (1949)
 String Quartet No. 1 (1950)
 Sonata in G Major for violin and piano (1950)
 Sonatina in G Major for violin and piano (1952) 
 Trio in C Major for violin, cello and piano (1955)
 Piano Trio in C Major (1955)
 Wind Quintet No.1 (1956)
 String Quartet No.2 (1957)
 Sonata for clarinet and piano (1958)
 Sonatina for trombone and piano (1956)
 Sonata No.2 for violin and piano (1959)
  (Ballad and Burlesque) for cello and piano (1963)
 Concertino for trombone and piano (1964)
  (Four Compositions) for oboe (or clarinet) and piano (1965)
 Sonata for solo guitar (1965)
  (Four Pieces) for violin and guitar (1966)
 Sonata for flute and piano (1966)
 String Quartet No.3 (1966)
  (Three Pieces) for cello and piano (1968)
 Wind Quintet No.2 (1969)
  for horn and piano (1971)
 Sonata for cello and piano (1971)

Keyboard
 Variations (1948)
 Three Polka Studies (1949)
 Preludium and Toccata (1950)
 Sonata No.1 for piano (1956)
 Sonata No.2 for piano (1961)
  (Eight Compositions) for piano (1965)
  (Eight Compositions for Young Pianists) (1967)
 Sonata for harpsichord (1967)
 Sonata No.3 for piano (1970)

Vocal
 Komsomol, Cantata (1951); 3rd prize winner at the 3rd World Festival of Youth and Students in Berlin
  (Song of the New Age), Cantata for chorus and orchestra (1962); text by Václav Nekvinda
  (Three Male Choruses) (1963); words by Miroslav Florian, Paul Verlaine and František Hrubín
  (Four Songs for Children) with piano accompaniment (1965); words by Václav Nekvinda, J. Havel and Zdeněk Kriebel
  (Four Children's Choruses) (1965); words by Zdeněk Kriebel

Notes

References 
 
   (H 7127)

External links 
 Lubor Bárta at the Czech Music Information Centre

1928 births
1972 deaths
Czech classical composers
Czech male classical composers
20th-century classical composers
People from Svitavy District
Charles University alumni
20th-century Czech male musicians